Artillery in Japan was first used during the Sengoku period in the 16th century; and its use has continued to develop.

History

13th to 17th century

Due to its proximity with China, Japan had long been familiar with gunpowder. Primitive cannons seem to have appeared in Japan around 1270, as simple metal tubes invented in China and called Teppō (鉄砲 Lit. "Iron cannon"). They don't seem to have been used extensively however, and cannon usage would only become major after the arrival of the Portuguese in 1543.

A few light cannon pieces were used at the Battle of Nagashino in 1575, but the first cannons entirely made by the Japanese were cast a few months after the battle. They were bronze two-pounders, about 9 feet long, and were delivered to the warlord Oda Nobunaga.

The first Japanese matchlock guns were designed by the Japanese after Tanegashima Tokitaka bought two matchlock guns from Portuguese adventurers who were aboard a Chinese junk ship in Tanegashima. Within ten years of its introduction, over 300,000 tanegashima firearms were reported to have been manufactured.

Quick-firing breech-loading swivel guns, were also used and manufactured by Japan. Such guns were in use in Western warships, and mounted at the bow and sterns to devastating effect, but the Japanese used them also in fortifications.

After 1601 and the reunification of Japan under Tokugawa Ieyasu and the establishment of the Tokugawa Shogunate, a policy of seclusion was progressively enforced, leading to the expulsion of foreigner and the interdiction of trade with Western countries other than the Dutch from 1631.

Meiji restoration and modern era

Following the Meiji Restoration, Japan would pursue a policy of "Rich country, strong army" (富国強兵), which led to a general rearmament of the country. During the 1877 Satsuma rebellion artillery was widely deployed, and an average of 1,000 artillery shells were fired every day. Makeshift wooden cannons were again seen on the "rebel" side of this conflict, and during popular upheavals in 1884.

Japanese artillery would then be used effectively during the Sino-Japanese war (1894–1895), and the Russo-Japanese war of 1905.

The Imperial Japanese Navy enjoyed a spectacular development, allowing for the implementation of ever-larger artillery pieces. The Imperial Navy was the world's first to mount  guns (in Kongō),  guns (in ), and only the second Navy ever to mount  guns (in the Yamato class).

Before and during World War II, Japan deployed a variety of artillery pieces, such as the heavy Type 89 15 cm Cannon or the Type 96 15 cm Howitzer (1936) .

Gallery

See also
 Firearms of Japan
 Korean cannon
 List of artillery weapons of the Imperial Japanese Navy

Notes

References
 Evans, David C & Peattie, Mark R. (1997). Kaigun: strategy, tactics, and technology in the Imperial Japanese Navy, 1887–1941 Naval Institute Press, Annapolis, Maryland  
 Jansen, Marius B. (2000). The Making of Modern Japan. Cambridge: Harvard University Press. ;  OCLC 44090600
 Perrin, Noel. (1979). Giving up the Gun, Japan's reversion to the Sword, 1543-1879. Boston: David R. Godine. 
 Totman, Conrad. (1980). Collapse of the Tokugawa Bakufu, 1862-1868 Honolulu: University of Hawai'i Press.

External links

 
Samurai weapons and equipment